Anopterus glandulosus, commonly known as native laurel or Tasmanian laurel, is a species of shrub or small tree in the family Escalloniaceae.

Taxonomy 
The name Anopterus comes from the Ancient Greek words ano (upwards) and pteron (wing), referring to its characteristic winged seeds, while glandulosus refers to the glandular tips present at the end of each leaf serration. The signature 'Labill' often appears after the Latin name of this species as it was first described by Jacques Labillardière in 1805. It is one of two Tasmanian plants in the ancient Gondwanan family Escalloniaceae, the other plant being Tetracarpaea tasmanica.

Anopterus is an endemic Australian genus and Anopterus glandulosus is one of two species in the genus. The other species, Anopterus macleayanus or ‘Queensland Laurel’/ ‘Macleay Laurel’ is found in subtropical, warm and cool temperate forests near the coast in New South Wales and Queensland.

Description 

In shaded understorey conditions its growth habit is often straggly with branches forming layers resulting in coppiced growth. Leaves are thick, dark green with a glabrous surface and glossy appearance. Leaf margins are serrated with blunt tips and a black gland at the apex of each serration. Leaf shape ranges from lanceolate elliptical to oblanceolate with an acute apex and leaf base which narrows into a short petiole.

Flowering occurs in late spring and often again in autumn. The flower heads, known as inflorescences, are borne in terminal racemes which are about the same length as the leaves. The flowers are composed of six ovate petals,  in length which overlap and are colored white or pink flushed. Flowers usually have six sepals, which are joined at the base with spreading lobes, and six stamens opposite the sepals, which are filamentous and shorter than petals.) Each flower has two large joined carpels which are bright green in colour. The ovary is superior and conical, tapering to a short style and bifid stigma.

Similar species 
The foliage arrangement and habit of Anopterus glandulosus are similar to Cenarrhenes nitida (Port Arthur/ native plum) with opposite leaves arranged in apparent spreading whorls. A. glandulosus can be distinguished from Cenarrhenes nitida by a tendency for leaves to occur in clusters at the ends of branches. Cenarrhenes nitida can also be distinguished by the absence of glands at leaf tips and an unpleasant foetid odour when leaves are crushed.

Ecology and distribution 
Anopterus glandulosus is a slow growing shrub to small tree which occurs in wet sclerophyll forest and rainforests, in the south and west of Tasmania at elevations below 1200 m. A. glandulosus prefers cool, moist conditions in partly shaded conditions with well drained soils, from loamy to sandy and highly organic soils. More seedlings of this species germinate and grow on rotting fallen logs than soil. It most commonly occurs as an understorey shrub often under a canopy of Nothofagus cunninghamii (myrtle beech). It is susceptible to the plant disease Phytophthora cinnamomi, which causes ‘root rot’ or ’dieback’, and does not tolerate excess phosphorus. However, this species is highly adaptable and tolerates harsh conditions including to frost and snow. Due to its rainforest habitat it is also adapted for continuous regeneration and regenerates well after disturbance, often undergoing rapid regrowth to form thickets in response to mechanical damage. The attractive and strongly scented flowers produce large amounts of nectar, attracting insects and birds and birds that feed on both nectar and insects such as honeyeaters.

Status 
The species was listed as not threatened and present in state reserves by the National Parks and Wildlife service Tasmania in 1997 and remains widespread and non-threatened today.

Cultivation 
Anopterus glandulosus is an attractive and easily cultivated plant, making it an excellent for gardens. Successful cultivation can be achieved by germination of fresh seed or propagation from semi-hardwood cuttings taken in March or April. Germination from seed can take 4–5 months, and requires constant moisture.

This species tolerates full sun to shade and is easily grown in a semi- protected environment, against a wall or fence, and grows particularly well as a container plant. It requires ample water in summer and benefits from application of non-phosphate based organic fertilisers along with manure and mulch. This species also responds well to annular pruning, and its attractive evergreen foliage can be harvested for floriculture.

References

External links 
 
 

Asterids of Australia
Endemic flora of Tasmania
Trees of Australia
Escalloniaceae
Plants described in 1805